is an anime television series created by screenwriter Shō Aikawa, Pierrot, and Pony Canyon. It consists of two seasons, totaling forty-eight episodes. The story is about three orphaned sisters who have, through a mysterious twist of fate, inherited their very own god - the -tall Neo Ranga.

Neo Ranga was originally aired in Japan as part of the omnibus show Anime Complex. ADV Films licensed the anime in English.

Story

The Shimabara sisters (Manami, Ushio, and Yuuhi) are living on their own, with the eldest sister as their breadwinner, when a young man from the fictional Pacific island of Barou arrives with news of their long-missing brother. Their brother had married into the Barou royalty, but died, leaving the sisters as the hereditary rulers of Barou. As the rulers of Barou, they now fall under the protection of the island's god, Neo Ranga, which turns out to be a gigantic monster reminiscent of Godzilla.  He follows them back to Japan, where Neoranga quickly runs afoul of the Japan Self-Defense Forces.

Characters
Ushio Shimabara is a somewhat tomboyish, yet slightly shy and a bit reserved fifteen-year-old with a keen sense of justice and selflessness.  She quickly accepts Joel's presence, as well as her position as a keeper of Neo Ranga.  Ushio is often seen as being more empathetic and sensible than her siblings, especially in regards to Neo Ranga's interactions with everyday Japanese people.

Voice: Yūko Miyamura (Japanese), Kelli Cousins (English)

Minami Shimabara, twenty-four years old, is the eldest of the sisters  and essentially acts as a surrogate mother to Ushio and Yuuhi.  She works multiple jobs to provide for her family, including delivering newspapers and working as a hostess.  She is also the owner of the Star Hole Company, which educates young people on how to handle media pressure as a celebrity, and this experience becomes critical when she and her sisters inherit Neo Ranga.  Minami tends to be seen as cold and aloof, partially due to her protective nature and attitude, and partially due to her constant concern with money, and because she is using Neo Ranga for financial gain.

Voice: Yuko Sumitomo (Japanese), Kaytha Coker (English)

Yuuhi Shimabara, thirteen years old, attends a private school in Shinagawa, Tokyo as the result of a scholarship.  She is not above using her cute appearance to receive expensive gifts and favors from admirers, even including her teacher.  While she is outwardly the most selfish of the sisters, she is also the most popular.  Yuuhi takes pleasure in using Neo Ranga to intimidate unsavory elements in her neighborhood such as the yakuza, much to her sisters' consternation.

Voice: Eri Sendai (Japanese), Kira Vincent-Davis (English)

Joel is the harbinger of news from the older brother of the Shimabara trio, and apparently their nephew.  He is always accompanied by a small white dragon, and wears his hair in a long braid.

Voice: Kōki Miyata (Japanese), Kevin Corn (English)

Neo Ranga is the giant protector god of Barou resembling a cross between Godzilla and a large, semi-organic mecha, but perhaps more accurately described as being similar to a golem. It is vaguely humanoid in shape, colored black and gray, and covered with red swirls. Neo Ranga does not talk, and is only able to express itself with its movements and its mysterious eyes.

Kyoshin
Antagonistic  gods of the series and other members of Ranga's race.

Lord Reiya
Minakata
Mecha Minakata
Salume
Yamase
Kamikaze Yamase
Yoshino
Hatsune
Ibuki
Akasa
Appa
Plutiwee

Music
Opening theme
Episodes 1-24 : "Kaze no Nemuru Shima" - Yūko Miyamura, Yuuko Sumitomo, and Eri Sendai
Episodes 25-48 : "Kami to Nare" - Kuniaki Haishima
Ending Theme
Episodes 1-24 :  "Prologue ~A City In The Sky " by Masaaki Ito
Episodes 25-48 : "Kawaki No Miwa Ni Te" - Yuko Miyamura, Yuko Sumitomo, and Eri Sendai

References

External links
  Official Japanese website
 

1998 anime television series debuts
Action anime and manga
ADV Films
Adventure anime and manga
Drama anime and manga
Fantasy anime and manga
Mecha anime and manga
Pierrot (company)
Films with screenplays by Shō Aikawa
Wowow original programming